The Augusta and Summerville Railroad  is a railroad in Georgia, United States.

It was chartered in 1866 and operated until 1888 using horses to pull rail cars over a 7-mile route. Eventually the horses were retired and the A&S ended up operating a 3-mile railroad to provide connections between other railroads.

Between 1897 and 1900, the A&S was sold jointly to the Southern Railway, the Central of Georgia Railway, the Charleston and Western Carolina Railway and the Georgia Railroad.

The A&S is currently operated as a switching line jointly owned by CSX Transportation and the Norfolk Southern Railway.

References

 
 

Georgia (U.S. state) railroads
Railway companies established in 1866
Switching and terminal railroads
History of Augusta, Georgia
Non-operating common carrier freight railroads in the United States